Valerian Oniţiu (also Valeriu Oniţiu) (April 8, 1872, Sibiu, Romania – 31 December 1948, Timișoara) was a Romanian chess problemist.

Oniţiu composed all types of problems particularly  fairy chess problems. Oniţiu has ten chess problems in FIDE Albums.

Onitiu also did significant work on knight's tours. First in Problemist Fairy Chess Supplement (vol.1 no.12 Jun 1932 p.74) problems 452-455 he gives tours with ten three-unit lines. The editor T. R. Dawson states: "V. Onitiu writes to me that he has examined all possible cases, some 1330 in all, and is convinced that only six of them admit tours, namely Dr Hogrefe's , mine, and the following four new ones. Second in Fairy Chess Review (vol.4 no.3 Dec 1939 p.43 problem 4135, with solution in no.6 Jun 1940 p.93.) he gives a symmetric tour with squares in a knight chain. The editor states: "VO notes that he examined 144 dispositions of the squares, all that are possible for diametral symmetry, and this is the only case leading to a tour. Moreover every move of the tour is determined, so that the tour is UNIQUE in all the millions possible."

Problem 

The solution of this problem is: 1.Gh3 Gh4 2.Gh5 Gh6 3.Gh7 Gh8 4.Ge7 Gd7 5.Gc7 Gb7 6.Ga7+ Ga6 7.Ga5+ Ga4 8.Ga3#

This problem is a case of incidence of thematic tourney prescript problems with grasshoppers without limiting the number of the moves. Identical problems were sent independently by four composers at about the same time.

References

Further reading

External links 
 Oniţiu problems on PDB Server
 2005 Encyclopædia Universalis France S.A.
 Hannu Harkola (2007) Handbook of chess composition

Chess composers
1872 births
1948 deaths
Romanian chess players
People from Sibiu